Meat is animal flesh that is eaten as food. Humans have hunted, farmed, and scavenged animals for meat since prehistoric times. The establishment of settlements in the Neolithic Revolution allowed the domestication of animals such as chickens, sheep, rabbits, pigs, and cattle. This eventually led to their use in meat production on an industrial scale in slaughterhouses.

Meat is mainly composed of water, protein, and fat. It is edible raw but is normally eaten after it has been cooked and seasoned or processed in a variety of ways. Unprocessed meat will spoil or rot within hours or days as a result of infection with, and decomposition by, bacteria and fungi.

Meat is important to the food industry, economies, and cultures around the world. There are nonetheless people who choose to not eat meat (vegetarians) or any animal products (vegans), for reasons such as taste preferences, ethics, environmental concerns, health concerns or religious dietary rules.

Terminology 
The word meat comes from the Old English word , which referred to food in general.

Most often, meat refers to skeletal muscle and associated fat and other tissues, but it may also describe other edible tissues such as offal. Meat is sometimes also used in a more restrictive sense to mean the flesh of mammalian species (pigs, cattle, sheep, goats, etc.) raised and prepared for human consumption, to the exclusion of fish, other seafood, insects, poultry, or other animals.

In the context of food, meat can also refer to "the edible part of something as distinguished from its covering (such as a husk or shell)", for example, coconut meat.

In English, there are also specialized terms for the meat of particular animals. These terms originated with the Norman conquest of England in 1066: while the animals retained their English names, their meat as brought to the tables of the invaders was referred to them with the Norman French words for the respective animal. In time, these appellations came to be used by the entire population.

History

Hunting and farming

Paleontological evidence suggests that meat constituted a substantial proportion of the diet of the earliest humans. Early hunter-gatherers depended on the organized hunting of large animals such as bison and deer.

The domestication of animals, of which we have evidence dating back to the end of the last glacial period (c. 10,000 BCE), allowed the systematic production of meat and the breeding of animals with a view to improving meat production. Animals that are now principal sources of meat were domesticated in conjunction with the development of early civilizations:

 Sheep, originating from western Asia, were domesticated with the help of dogs prior to the establishment of settled agriculture, likely as early as the 8th millennium BCE. Several breeds of sheep were established in ancient Mesopotamia and Egypt by 3500–3000 BCE. Today, more than 200 sheep-breeds exist.
 Cattle were domesticated in Mesopotamia after settled agriculture was established about 5000 BCE, and several breeds were established by 2500 BCE. Modern domesticated cattle fall into the groups Bos taurus (European cattle) and Bos taurus indicus (zebu), both descended from the now-extinct aurochs. The breeding of beef cattle, cattle optimized for meat production as opposed to animals best suited for work or dairy purposes, began in the middle of the 18th century.

 Domestic pigs, which are descended from wild boars, are known to have existed about 2500 BCE in modern-day Hungary and in Troy; earlier pottery from Tell es-Sultan (Jericho) and Egypt depicts wild pigs. Pork sausages and hams were of great commercial importance in Greco-Roman times. Pigs continue to be bred intensively as they are being optimized to produce meat best suited for specific meat products.
 Goats are among the earliest animals domesticated by humans. The most recent genetic analysis confirms the archaeological evidence that the wild bezoar ibex of the Zagros Mountains is the likely original ancestor of probably all domestic goats today. Neolithic farmers began to herd wild goats primarily for easy access to milk and meat, as well as to their dung, which was used as fuel; and their bones, hair, and sinew were used for clothing, building, and tools. The earliest remnants of domesticated goats dating 10,000 years Before Present are found in Ganj Dareh in Iran. Goat remains have been found at archaeological sites in Jericho, Choga Mami, Djeitun, and Çayönü, dating the domestication of goats in Western Asia at between 8,000 and 9,000 years ago. Studies of DNA evidence suggests 10,000 years ago as the domestication date.
 Chicken were domesticated around 6000 BC in Southeast Asia, according to genomic analysis, and spread to China and India 2000–3000 years later. Archaeological evidence supports domestic chickens in Southeast Asia well before 6000 BCE, China by 6000 BCE and India by 2000 BCE.

Other animals are or have been raised or hunted for their flesh. The type of meat consumed varies much between different cultures, changes over time, depending on factors such as tradition and the availability of the animals. The amount and kind of meat consumed also varies by income, both between countries and within a given country.

 Deer are hunted for their meat (venison) in various regions.
 Horses are commonly eaten in France, Italy, Germany and Japan, among other countries. Horses and other large mammals such as reindeer were hunted during the late Paleolithic in western Europe.
 Dogs are consumed in China, South Korea and Vietnam. Dogs are also occasionally eaten in the Arctic regions. Historically, dog meat has been consumed in various parts of the world, such as Hawaii, Japan, Switzerland and Mexico.
 Cats are consumed in Southern China, Peru and sometimes also in Northern Italy.
 Guinea pigs are raised for their flesh in the Andes.
 Whales and dolphins are hunted, partly for their flesh, in Japan, Alaska, Siberia, Canada, the Faroe Islands, Greenland, Iceland, Saint Vincent and the Grenadines and by two small communities in Indonesia.

Modern agriculture employs a number of techniques, such as progeny testing, to speed artificial selection by breeding animals to rapidly acquire the qualities desired by meat producers. For instance, in the wake of well-publicised health concerns associated with saturated fats in the 1980s, the fat content of United Kingdom beef, pork and lamb fell from 20–26 percent to 4–8 percent within a few decades, due to both selective breeding for leanness and changed methods of butchery. Methods of genetic engineering aimed at improving the meat production qualities of animals are now also becoming available.

Even though it is a very old industry, meat production continues to be shaped strongly by the evolving demands of customers. The trend towards selling meat in pre-packaged cuts has increased the demand for larger breeds of cattle, which are better suited to producing such cuts. Even more animals not previously exploited for their meat are now being farmed, especially the more agile and mobile species, whose muscles tend to be developed better than those of cattle, sheep or pigs. Examples are the various antelope species, the zebra, water buffalo and camel, as well as non-mammals, such as the crocodile, emu and ostrich. Another important trend in contemporary meat production is organic farming which, while providing no organoleptic benefit to meat so produced, meets an increasing demand for organic meat.

Culture
For most of human history, meat was a largely unquestioned part of the human diet.  Only in the 20th century did it begin to become a topic of discourse and contention in society, politics and wider culture.

Consumption 

Meat consumption varies worldwide, depending on cultural or religious preferences, as well as economic conditions. Vegetarians and vegans choose not to eat meat because of taste preferences, ethical, economic, environmental, religious, or health concerns that are associated with meat production and consumption.

According to the analysis of the FAO, the overall consumption for white meat between 1990 and 2009 has dramatically increased. Poultry meat has increased by 76.6% per kilo per capita and pig meat by 19.7%.

Overall, diets that include meat are the most common worldwide according to the results of a 2018 Ipsos MORI study of 16–64 years olds in 28 countries. Ipsos states "An omnivorous diet is the most common diet globally, with non-meat diets (which can include fish) followed by over a tenth of the global population." Approximately 87% of people include meat in their diet in some frequency. 73% of meat eaters included it in their diet regularly and 14% consumed meat only occasionally or infrequently. Estimates of the non-meat diets were also broken down. About 3% of people followed vegan diets, where consumption of meat, eggs, and dairy are abstained from. About 5% of people followed vegetarian diets, where consumption of meat is abstained from, but egg and/or dairy consumption is not strictly restricted. About 3% of people followed pescetarian diets, where consumption of the meat of land animals is abstained from, fish meat and other seafood is consumed, and egg and/or dairy consumption may or may not be strictly restricted.

History
A bioarchaeological (specifically, isotopic analysis) study of early medieval England found, based on the funerary record, that high-meat protein diets were extremely rare, and that (contrary to previously held assumptions) elites did not consume more meat than non-elites, and men did not consume more meat than women.

In the nineteenth century meat consumption in Britain was the highest in Europe, exceeded only by that in British colonies. In 1904 laborers were found to consume  a year while aristocrats ate . There were estimated to be 43,000 meat purveyor establishments in Britain in 1910, with "possibly more money invested in the meat industry than in any other British business" except the finance industry. The US was a meat importing country by 1926.

Truncated lifespan as a result of intensive breeding allowed more meat to be produced from fewer animals. The world cattle population was about 600 million in 1929, with 700 million sheep and goats and 300 million pigs. According to a study, the average lifespan of livestock pigs is ~2 years (7% of "maximum expected lifespan"). For dairy cattle the lifespan is ~5 years (27%).

Animal growth and development
Agricultural science has identified several factors bearing on the growth and development of meat in animals.

Genetics 

Several economically important traits in meat animals are heritable to some degree (see the adjacent table) and can thus be selected for by animal breeding. In cattle, certain growth features are controlled by recessive genes which have not so far been controlled, complicating breeding. One such trait is dwarfism; another is the doppelender or "double muscling" condition, which causes muscle hypertrophy and thereby increases the animal's commercial value. Genetic analysis continues to reveal the genetic mechanisms that control numerous aspects of the endocrine system and, through it, meat growth and quality.

Genetic engineering techniques can shorten breeding programs significantly because they allow for the identification and isolation of genes coding for desired traits, and for the reincorporation of these genes into the animal genome. To enable such manipulation, research is ongoing to map the entire genome of sheep, cattle and pigs. Some research has already seen commercial application. For instance, a recombinant bacterium has been developed which improves the digestion of grass in the rumen of cattle, and some specific features of muscle fibres have been genetically altered.

Experimental reproductive cloning of commercially important meat animals such as sheep, pig or cattle has been successful. Multiple asexual reproduction of animals bearing desirable traits is anticipated, although this is not yet practical on a commercial scale.

Environment 
Heat regulation in livestock is of great economic significance, because mammals attempt to maintain a constant optimal body temperature. Low temperatures tend to prolong animal development and high temperatures tend to retard it. Depending on their size, body shape and insulation through tissue and fur, some animals have a relatively narrow zone of temperature tolerance and others (e.g. cattle) a broad one. Static magnetic fields, for reasons still unknown, also retard animal development.

Nutrition 
The quality and quantity of usable meat depends on the animal's plane of nutrition, i.e., whether it is over- or underfed. Scientists disagree about how exactly the plane of nutrition influences carcass composition.

The composition of the diet, especially the amount of protein provided, is also an important factor regulating animal growth.  Ruminants, which may digest cellulose, are better adapted to poor-quality diets, but their ruminal microorganisms degrade high-quality protein if supplied in excess. Because producing high-quality protein animal feed is expensive (see also Environmental impact below), several techniques are employed or experimented with to ensure maximum utilization of protein. These include the treatment of feed with formalin to protect amino acids during their passage through the rumen, the recycling of manure by feeding it back to cattle mixed with feed concentrates, or the partial conversion of petroleum hydrocarbons to protein through microbial action.

In plant feed, environmental factors influence the availability of crucial nutrients or micronutrients, a lack or excess of which can cause a great many ailments. In Australia, for instance, where the soil contains limited phosphate, cattle are being fed additional phosphate to increase the efficiency of beef production. Also in Australia, cattle and sheep in certain areas were often found losing their appetite and dying in the midst of rich pasture; this was at length found to be a result of cobalt deficiency in the soil. Plant toxins are also a risk to grazing animals; for instance, sodium fluoroacetate, found in some African and Australian plants, kills by disrupting the cellular metabolism. Certain man-made pollutants such as methylmercury and some pesticide residues present a particular hazard due to their tendency to bioaccumulate in meat, potentially poisoning consumers.

Animal welfare

Livestock animals have shown relatively high intelligence which may raise animal ethics rationale for safeguarding their well-being. Pigs in particular are considered by some to be the smartest known domesticated animal in the world (e.g. more intelligent than pet dogs) which not only experience pain but also have notable depths, levels and/or variety/diversity of emotions (including boredom), cognition, intelligence, and/or sentience. Complications include that without or reduced meat production, many livestock animals may never live (see also: natalism), and that their life (relative timespan of existence) is typically short – in the case of pigs ~7% of their "maximum expected lifespan".

Human intervention 
Meat producers may seek to improve the fertility of female animals through the administration of gonadotrophic or ovulation-inducing hormones. In pig production, sow infertility is a common problem – possibly due to excessive fatness. No methods currently exist to augment the fertility of male animals. Artificial insemination is now routinely used to produce animals of the best possible genetic quality, and the efficiency of this method is improved through the administration of hormones that synchronize the ovulation cycles within groups of females.

Growth hormones, particularly anabolic agents such as steroids, are used in some countries to accelerate muscle growth in animals. This practice has given rise to the beef hormone controversy, an international trade dispute. It may also decrease the tenderness of meat, although research on this is inconclusive, and have other effects on the composition of the muscle flesh. Where castration is used to improve control over male animals, its side effects are also counteracted by the administration of hormones. Myostatin-based muscle hypertrophy has also been used.

Sedatives may be administered to animals to counteract stress factors and increase weight gain. The feeding of antibiotics to certain animals has been shown to improve growth rates also. This practice is particularly prevalent in the US, but has been banned in the EU, partly because it causes antimicrobial resistance in pathogenic microorganisms.

Biochemical composition 
Numerous aspects of the biochemical composition of meat vary in complex ways depending on the species, breed, sex, age, plane of nutrition, training and exercise of the animal, as well as on the anatomical location of the musculature involved. Even between animals of the same litter and sex there are considerable differences in such parameters as the percentage of intramuscular fat.

Main constituents 
Adult mammalian muscle flesh consists of roughly 75 percent water, 19 percent protein, 2.5 percent intramuscular fat, 1.2 percent carbohydrates and 2.3 percent other soluble non-protein substances. These include nitrogenous compounds, such as amino acids, and inorganic substances such as minerals.

Muscle proteins are either soluble in water (sarcoplasmic proteins, about 11.5 percent of total muscle mass) or in concentrated salt solutions (myofibrillar proteins, about 5.5 percent of mass). There are several hundred sarcoplasmic proteins. Most of them – the glycolytic enzymes – are involved in the glycolytic pathway, i.e., the conversion of stored energy into muscle power. The two most abundant myofibrillar proteins, myosin and actin, are responsible for the muscle's overall structure. The remaining protein mass consists of connective tissue (collagen and elastin) as well as organelle tissue.

Fat in meat can be either adipose tissue, used by the animal to store energy and consisting of "true fats" (esters of glycerol with fatty acids), or intramuscular fat, which contains considerable quantities of phospholipids and of unsaponifiable constituents such as cholesterol.

Red and white 

Meat can be broadly classified as "red" or "white" depending on the concentration of myoglobin in muscle fibre. When myoglobin is exposed to oxygen, reddish oxymyoglobin develops, making myoglobin-rich meat appear red. The redness of meat depends on species, animal age, and fibre type: Red meat contains more narrow muscle fibres that tend to operate over long periods without rest, while white meat contains more broad fibres that tend to work in short fast bursts.

Generally, the meat of adult mammals such as cows, sheep, and horses is considered red, while chicken and turkey breast meat is considered white.

Nutritional information 

All muscle tissue is very high in protein, containing all of the essential amino acids, and in most cases is a good source of zinc, vitamin B12, selenium, phosphorus, niacin, vitamin B6, choline, riboflavin and iron. Several forms of meat are also high in vitamin K. Muscle tissue is very low in carbohydrates and does not contain dietary fiber. While taste quality may vary between meats, the proteins, vitamins, and minerals available from meats are generally consistent.

The fat content of meat can vary widely depending on the species and breed of animal, the way in which the animal was raised, including what it was fed, the anatomical part of the body, and the methods of butchering and cooking. Wild animals such as deer are typically leaner than farm animals, leading those concerned about fat content to choose game such as venison. Decades of breeding meat animals for fatness is being reversed by consumer demand for meat with less fat. The fatty deposits that exist with the muscle fibers in meats soften meat when it is cooked and improve the flavor through chemical changes initiated through heat that allow the protein and fat molecules to interact. The fat, when cooked with meat, also makes the meat seem juicier. The nutritional contribution of the fat is mainly calories as opposed to protein. As fat content rises, the meat's contribution to nutrition declines. In addition, there is cholesterol associated with fat surrounding the meat. The cholesterol is a lipid associated with the kind of saturated fat found in meat. The increase in meat consumption after 1960 is associated with, though not definitively the cause of, significant imbalances of fat and cholesterol in the human diet.

The table in this section compares the nutritional content of several types of meat. While each kind of meat has about the same content of protein and carbohydrates, there is a very wide range of fat content.

Production 

Meat is produced by killing an animal and cutting flesh out of it. These procedures are called slaughter and butchery, respectively. There is ongoing research into producing meat in vitro; that is, outside of animals.

Transport 
Upon reaching a predetermined age or weight, livestock are usually transported en masse to the slaughterhouse. Depending on its length and circumstances, this may exert stress and injuries on the animals, and some may die en route. Unnecessary stress in transport may adversely affect the quality of the meat. In particular, the muscles of stressed animals are low in water and glycogen, and their pH fails to attain acidic values, all of which results in poor meat quality. Consequently, and also due to campaigning by animal welfare groups, laws and industry practices in several countries tend to become more restrictive with respect to the duration and other circumstances of livestock transports.

Slaughter 

Animals are usually slaughtered by being first stunned and then exsanguinated (bled out). Death results from the one or the other procedure, depending on the methods employed. Stunning can be effected through asphyxiating the animals with carbon dioxide, shooting them with a gun or a captive bolt pistol, or shocking them with electric current. In most forms of ritual slaughter, stunning is not allowed.

Draining as much blood as possible from the carcass is necessary because blood causes the meat to have an unappealing appearance and is a breeding ground for microorganisms. The exsanguination is accomplished by severing the carotid artery and the jugular vein in cattle and sheep, and the anterior vena cava in pigs.

The act of slaughtering animals for meat, or of raising or transporting animals for slaughter, may engender both psychological stress and physical trauma in the people involved. Additionally, slaughterhouse workers are exposed to noise of between 76 and 100 dB from the screams of animals being killed. 80 dB is the threshold at which the wearing of ear protection is recommended.

Dressing and cutting 
After exsanguination, the carcass is dressed; that is, the head, feet, hide (except hogs and some veal), excess fat, viscera and offal are removed, leaving only bones and edible muscle. Cattle and pig carcases, but not those of sheep, are then split in half along the mid ventral axis, and the carcase is cut into wholesale pieces. The dressing and cutting sequence, long a province of manual labor, is progressively being fully automated.

Conditioning 

Under hygienic conditions and without other treatment, meat can be stored at above its freezing point (–1.5 °C) for about six weeks without spoilage, during which time it undergoes an aging process that increases its tenderness and flavor.

During the first day after death, glycolysis continues until the accumulation of lactic acid causes the pH to reach about 5.5. The remaining glycogen, about 18 g per kg, is believed to increase the water-holding capacity and tenderness of the flesh when cooked. Rigor mortis sets in a few hours after death as ATP is used up, causing actin and myosin to combine into rigid actomyosin and lowering the meat's water-holding capacity, causing it to lose water ("weep"). In muscles that enter rigor in a contracted position, actin and myosin filaments overlap and cross-bond, resulting in meat that is tough on cooking – hence again the need to prevent pre-slaughter stress in the animal.

Over time, the muscle proteins denature in varying degree, with the exception of the collagen and elastin of connective tissue, and rigor mortis resolves. Because of these changes, the meat is tender and pliable when cooked just after death or after the resolution of rigor, but tough when cooked during rigor. As the muscle pigment myoglobin denatures, its iron oxidates, which may cause a brown discoloration near the surface of the meat. Ongoing proteolysis also contributes to conditioning. Hypoxanthine, a breakdown product of ATP, contributes to the meat's flavor and odor, as do other products of the decomposition of muscle fat and protein.

Additives 

When meat is industrially processed in preparation of consumption, it may be enriched with additives to protect or modify its flavor or color, to improve its tenderness, juiciness or cohesiveness, or to aid with its preservation. Meat additives include the following:
 Salt is the most frequently used additive in meat processing. It imparts flavor but also inhibits microbial growth, extends the product's shelf life and helps emulsifying finely processed products, such as sausages. Ready-to-eat meat products normally contain about 1.5 to 2.5 percent salt. Salt water or similar substances may also be injected into poultry meat to improve the taste and increase the weight, in a process called plumping.
 Nitrite is used in curing meat to stabilize the meat's color and flavor, and inhibits the growth of spore-forming microorganisms such as C. botulinum. The use of nitrite's precursor nitrate is now limited to a few products such as dry sausage, prosciutto or parma ham.
 Phosphates used in meat processing are normally alkaline polyphosphates such as sodium tripolyphosphate. They are used to increase the water-binding and emulsifying ability of meat proteins, but also limit lipid oxidation and flavor loss, and reduce microbial growth.
 Erythorbate or its equivalent ascorbic acid (vitamin C) is used to stabilize the color of cured meat.
 Sweeteners such as sugar or corn syrup impart a sweet flavor, bind water and assist surface browning during cooking in the Maillard reaction.
 Seasonings impart or modify flavor. They include spices or oleoresins extracted from them, herbs, vegetables and essential oils.
 Flavorings such as monosodium glutamate impart or strengthen a particular flavor.
 Tenderizers break down collagens to make the meat more palatable for consumption. They include proteolytic enzymes, acids, salt and phosphate.
 Dedicated antimicrobials include lactic, citric and acetic acid, sodium diacetate, acidified sodium chloride or calcium sulfate, cetylpyridinium chloride, activated lactoferrin, sodium or potassium lactate, or bacteriocins such as nisin.
 Antioxidants include a wide range of chemicals that limit lipid oxidation, which creates an undesirable "off flavor", in precooked meat products.
 Acidifiers, most often lactic or citric acid, can impart a tangy or tart flavor note, extend shelf-life, tenderize fresh meat or help with protein denaturation and moisture release in dried meat. They substitute for the process of natural fermentation that acidifies some meat products such as hard salami or prosciutto.

Misidentification 
With the rise of complex supply chains, including cold chains, in developed economies, the distance between the farmer or fisherman and customer has grown, increasing the possibility for intentional and unintentional misidentification of meat at various points in the supply chain.

In 2013, reports emerged across Europe that products labelled as containing beef actually contained horse meat. In February 2013 a study was published showing that about one-third of raw fish are misidentified across the United States.

Imitation 

Various forms of imitation meat have been created for people who wish not to eat meat but still want to taste its flavor and texture. Meat imitates are typically some form of processed soybean (tofu, tempeh), but they can also be based on wheat gluten, pea protein isolate, or even fungi (quorn).

Environmental impact 

Various environmental effects are associated with meat production. Among these are greenhouse gas emissions, fossil energy use, water use, water quality changes, and effects on grazed ecosystems.

The livestock sector may be the largest source of water pollution (due to animal wastes, fertilizers, pesticides), and it contributes to emergence of antibiotic resistance. It accounts for over 8% of global human water use. It is a significant driver of biodiversity loss and ecosystems, as it causes deforestation and requires large amounts of land for pasture and feed crops, ocean dead zones, land degradation, pollution, overfishing and climate change.

The occurrence, nature and significance of environmental effects varies among livestock production systems. Grazing of livestock can be beneficial for some wildlife species, but not for others. Targeted grazing of livestock is used as a food-producing alternative to herbicide use in some vegetation management.

Land use 

Meat production is by far the biggest cause of land use, as it accounts for nearly 40% of the global land surface. Just in the contiguous United States, 34% of its land area are used as pasture and rangeland, mostly feeding livestock, not counting  of cropland (20%), some of which is used for producing feed for livestock. Roughly 75% of deforested land around the globe is used for livestock pasture. Deforestation from practices like slash-and-burn releases  and removes the carbon sink of grown tropical forest ecosystems which substantially mitigate climate change. The land use is a major pressure on pressure on fertile soils which is important for global food security.

Climate change 

The rising global consumption of carbon-intensive meat products has "exploded the global carbon footprint of agriculture," according to some top scientists. Meat production is responsible for 14.5% and possibly up to 51% of the world's anthropogenic greenhouse gas emissions. Some nations show very different impacts to counterparts within the same group, with Brazil and Australia having emissions over 200% higher than the average of their respective income groups and driven by meat consumption.

According to the Assessing the Environmental Impacts of Consumption and Production report produced by United Nations Environment Programme's (UNEP) international panel for sustainable resource management, a worldwide transition in the direction of a meat and dairy free diet is indispensable if adverse global climate change were to be prevented. A 2019 report in The Lancet recommended that global meat (and sugar) consumption be reduced by 50 percent to mitigate climate change. Meat consumption in Western societies needs to be reduced by up to 90% according to a 2018 study published in Nature. The 2019 special report by the Intergovernmental Panel on Climate Change called for significantly reducing meat consumption, particularly in wealthy countries, in order to mitigate and adapt to climate change.

Biodiversity loss
Meat consumption is considered one of the primary contributors of the sixth mass extinction. A 2017 study by the World Wildlife Fund found that 60% of global biodiversity loss is attributable to meat-based diets, in particular from the vast scale of feed crop cultivation needed to rear tens of billions of farm animals for human consumption puts an enormous strain on natural resources resulting in a wide-scale loss of lands and species. Currently, livestock make up 60% of the biomass of all mammals on earth, followed by humans (36%) and wild mammals (4%). In November 2017, 15,364 world scientists signed a Warning to Humanity calling for, among other things, drastically diminishing our per capita consumption of meat and "dietary shifts towards mostly plant-based foods". The 2019 Global Assessment Report on Biodiversity and Ecosystem Services, released by IPBES, also recommended reductions in meat consumption in order to mitigate biodiversity loss. A 2021 Chatham House report asserted that a significant shift towards plant-based diets would free up the land to allow for the restoration of ecosystems and thriving biodiversity.

A July 2018 study in Science says that meat consumption is set to rise as the human population increases along with affluence, which will increase greenhouse gas emissions and further reduce biodiversity.

Reducing environmental impact
The environmental impact of meat production can be reduced by conversion of human-inedible residues of food crops. Manure from meat-producing livestock is used as fertilizer; it may be composted before application to food crops. Substitution of animal manures for synthetic fertilizers in crop production can be environmentally significant, as between 43 and 88 MJ of fossil fuel energy are used per kg of nitrogen in manufacture of synthetic nitrogenous fertilizers.

Reducing meat consumption

The IPCC and many others, including scientific reviews of the literature and data on the topic, have concluded that meat production has to be reduced substantially for any sufficient mitigation of climate change and, at least initially, largely through shifts towards plant-based diets in cases (e.g. countries) where meat consumption is high. A review names broad potential measures such as "restrictions or fiscal mechanisms". Personal Carbon Allowances that allow a certain amount of free meat consumption per person would be a form of restriction, meat taxes would be a type of fiscal mechanism. Meat can be replaced by, for example, high-protein iron-rich low-emission legumes and common fungi, but there are also dietary supplements (e.g. of vitamin B12 and zinc) and/or fortified foods, cultured meat (still under development), microbial foods, mycoprotein, meat substitutes, and other alternatives. Farms can be transitioned to meet new demands, workers can enter relevant job retraining programs, and land previously used for meat production can be rewilded.

The biologists Rodolfo Dirzo, Gerardo Ceballos, and Paul R. Ehrlich emphasize that it is the "massive planetary monopoly of industrial meat production that needs to be curbed" while respecting the cultural traditions of indigenous peoples, for whom meat is an important source of protein.

Spoilage and preservation 

The spoilage of meat occurs, if untreated, in a matter of hours or days and results in the meat becoming unappetizing, poisonous or infectious. Spoilage is caused by the practically unavoidable infection and subsequent decomposition of meat by bacteria and fungi, which are borne by the animal itself, by the people handling the meat, and by their implements. Meat can be kept edible for a much longer time – though not indefinitely – if proper hygiene is observed during production and processing, and if appropriate food safety, food preservation and food storage procedures are applied. Without the application of preservatives and stabilizers, the fats in meat may also begin to rapidly decompose after cooking or processing, leading to an objectionable taste known as warmed over flavor.

Methods of preparation 

Fresh meat can be cooked for immediate consumption, or be processed, that is, treated for longer-term preservation and later consumption, possibly after further preparation. Fresh meat cuts or processed cuts may produce iridescence, commonly thought to be due to spoilage but actually caused by structural coloration and diffraction of the light. A common additive to processed meats for both preservation and the prevention of discoloration is sodium nitrite. This substance is a source of health concerns because it may form carcinogenic nitrosamines when heated.

Meat is prepared in many ways, as steaks, in stews, fondue, or as dried meat like beef jerky. It may be ground then formed into patties (as hamburgers or croquettes), loaves, or sausages, or used in loose form (as in "sloppy joe" or Bolognese sauce).

Some meat is cured by smoking, which is the process of flavoring, cooking, or preserving food by exposing it to the smoke from burning or smoldering plant materials, most often wood. In Europe, alder is the traditional smoking wood, but oak is more often used now, and beech to a lesser extent. In North America, hickory, mesquite, oak, pecan, alder, maple, and fruit-tree woods are commonly used for smoking. Meat can also be cured by pickling, preserving in salt or brine (see salted meat and other curing methods). Other kinds of meat are marinated and barbecued, or simply boiled, roasted, or fried.

Meat is generally eaten cooked, but many recipes call for raw beef, veal or fish (tartare). Steak tartare is a meat dish made from finely chopped or minced raw beef or horse meat. Meat is often spiced or seasoned, particularly with meat products such as sausages. Meat dishes are usually described by their source (animal and part of body) and method of preparation (e.g., a beef rib).

Meat is a typical base for making sandwiches. Popular varieties of sandwich meat include ham, pork, salami and other sausages, and beef, such as steak, roast beef, corned beef, pepperoni, and pastrami. Meat can also be molded or pressed (common for products that include offal, such as haggis and scrapple) and canned.

Health 

There is concern and debate regarding the potential association of meat, in particular red and processed meat, with a variety of health risks. A study of 400,000 subjects conducted by the European Prospective Investigation into Cancer and Nutrition and published in 2013 showed "a moderate positive association between processed meat consumption and mortality, in particular due to cardiovascular diseases, but also to cancer."

In 2015, the International Agency for Research on Cancer of the World Health Organization (WHO) classified processed meat as carcinogenic to humans (Group 1), based on "sufficient evidence in humans that the consumption of processed meat causes colorectal cancer." In the same year, the Agency classified red meat as probably (Group 2A) carcinogenic to humans.

The 2015–2020 Dietary Guidelines for Americans asked men and teenage boys to increase their consumption of vegetables or other underconsumed foods (fruits, whole grains, and dairy) while reducing intake of protein foods (meats, poultry, and eggs) that they currently overconsume.

Health authorities around the world recommend limiting consumption of unprocessed red meat (such as a beef steak) and also discourage consumption of processed meat (such as bacon). In 2021, a study of data on half a million U.K. citizens shows associations between high levels of meat intake with risks of some of 25 common conditions including ischaemic heart disease and diabetes as well as a lower risk of iron deficiency anaemia. A cohort study with over 130,000 participants published a few days later, also found that a higher intake of processed meat was associated with "a higher risk of mortality and major CVD". However, while some of the results did control for body mass index various other factors that were not controlled for may confound the associations and research of underlying mechanisms may be required for fully robust conclusions. Studies have however concluded that plant-based diets "rich in legumes, whole grains, and nuts with reduced red and processed meats" and low in overall meat consumption (except for fish) are associated with longer life expectancy, whereby a switch from a "typical Western diet" in adults can increase life expectancy by a decade.

Contamination 
Various toxic compounds can contaminate meat, including heavy metals, mycotoxins, pesticide residues, dioxins, polychlorinated biphenyl (PCBs). Processed, smoked and cooked meat may contain carcinogens such as polycyclic aromatic hydrocarbons.

Toxins may be introduced to meat as part of animal feed, as veterinary drug residues, or during processing and cooking. Often, these compounds can be metabolized in the body to form harmful by-products. Negative effects depend on the individual genome, diet, and history of the consumer. Any chemical's toxicity is also dependent on the dose and timing of exposure.

Cancer 

There are concerns about a relationship between the consumption of meat, in particular processed and red meat, and increased cancer risk. The International Agency for Research on Cancer (IARC), a specialized agency of the World Health Organization (WHO), classified processed meat (e.g., bacon, ham, hot dogs, sausages) as, "carcinogenic to humans (Group 1), based on sufficient evidence in humans that the consumption of processed meat causes colorectal cancer." IARC also classified red meat as "probably carcinogenic to humans (Group 2A), based on limited evidence that the consumption of red meat causes cancer in humans and strong mechanistic evidence supporting a carcinogenic effect."

Obesity 
Prospective analysis suggests that meat consumption is positively associated with weight gain in men and women. The National Cattlemen's Beef Association countered by stating that meat consumption may not be associated with fat gain. In response, the authors of the original study controlled for just abdominal fat across a sample of 91,214 people and found that even when controlling for calories and lifestyle factors, meat consumption is linked with obesity. Additional studies and reviews have confirmed the finding that greater meat consumption is positively linked with greater weight gain even when controlling for calories, and lifestyle factors.

Bacterial contamination 
Bacterial contamination has been seen with meat products. A 2011 study by the Translational Genomics Research Institute showed that nearly half (47%) of the meat and poultry in U.S. grocery stores were contaminated with S. aureus, with more than half (52%) of those bacteria resistant to antibiotics. A 2018 investigation by the Bureau of Investigative Journalism and The Guardian found that around 15 percent of the US population suffers from foodborne illnesses every year. The investigation also highlighted unsanitary conditions in US-based meat plants, which included meat products covered in excrement and abscesses "filled with pus".

Infectious diseases 
Meat production and trade substantially increases risks for infectious diseases, including of pandemics – "directly through increased contact with wild and farmed animals [(zoonosis)] or indirectly through its impact on the environment (e.g., biodiversity loss, water use, climate change)". For example, avian influenza from poultry meat production can be a threat to human health. Furthermore, the use of antibiotics in meat production contributes to antimicrobial resistance – which contributes to millions of deaths – and makes it harder to control infectious diseases.

Changes in consumer behavior 
In response to changing prices as well as health concerns about saturated fat and cholesterol (see lipid hypothesis), consumers have altered their consumption of various meats. A USDA report points out that consumption of beef in the United States between 1970 and 1974 and 1990–1994 dropped by 21%, while consumption of chicken increased by 90%. During the same period of time, the price of chicken dropped by 14% relative to the price of beef. From 1995 to 1996, beef consumption increased due to higher supplies and lower prices.

Cooking 
Meat can transmit certain diseases, but complete cooking and avoiding recontamination reduces this possibility.

Several studies published since 1990 indicate that cooking muscle meat creates heterocyclic amines (HCAs), which are thought to increase cancer risk in humans. Researchers at the National Cancer Institute published results of a study which found that human subjects who ate beef rare or medium-rare had less than one third the risk of stomach cancer than those who ate beef medium-well or well-done. While eating muscle meat raw may be the only way to avoid HCAs fully, the National Cancer Institute states that cooking meat below  creates "negligible amounts" of HCAs. Also, microwaving meat before cooking may reduce HCAs by 90%.

Nitrosamines, present in processed and cooked foods, have been noted as being carcinogenic, being linked to colon cancer. Also, toxic compounds called PAHs, or polycyclic aromatic hydrocarbons, present in processed, smoked and cooked foods, are known to be carcinogenic.

Heart disease 

The correlation of consumption to increased risk of heart disease is controversial. Some studies fail to find a link between red meat consumption and heart disease (although the same study found statistically significant correlation between the consumption of processed meat and coronary heart disease). A large cohort study of Seventh-Day Adventists in California found that the risk of heart disease is three times greater for 45-64-year-old men who eat meat daily, versus those who did not eat meat. This study compared adventists to the general population and not other Seventh Day Adventists who ate meat and did not specifically distinguish red and processed meat in its assessment.

A Harvard University study in 2010 involving over one million people who ate meat found that only processed meat had an adverse risk in relation to coronary heart disease. The study suggests that eating 50 g (less than 2 ounces) of processed meat per day increases risk of coronary heart disease by 42%, and diabetes by 19%. Equivalent levels of fat, including saturated fats, in unprocessed meat (even when eating twice as much per day) did not show any deleterious effects, leading the researchers to suggest that "differences in salt and preservatives, rather than fats, might explain the higher risk of heart disease and diabetes seen with processed meats, but not with unprocessed red meats."

A scientific review concluded that, except for poultry, at 50 g/day unprocessed red and processed meat appear to be risk factors for ischemic heart disease, increasing the risk by about 9 and 18% respectively.

Sociology
Meat is part of the human diet in most cultures, where it often has symbolic meaning and important social functions. Some people choose not to eat meat (vegetarianism) or any food made from animals (veganism). The reasons for not eating all or some meat may include ethical objections to killing animals for food, health concerns, environmental concerns or religious dietary laws.

Ethics 

Ethical issues regarding the consumption of meat include objecting to the act of killing animals or to the agricultural practices used in meat production. Reasons for objecting to killing animals for consumption may include animal rights, environmental ethics, or an aversion to inflicting pain or harm on other sentient creatures. Some people, while not vegetarians, refuse to eat the flesh of certain animals (such as cows, pigs, cats, dogs, horses, or rabbits) due to cultural or religious traditions.

Philosophy 
The founders of Western philosophy disagreed about the ethics of eating meat. Plato's Republic has Socrates describe the ideal state as vegetarian. Pythagoras believed that humans and animals were equal and therefore disapproved of meat consumption, as did Plutarch, whereas Zeno and Epicurus were vegetarian but allowed meat-eating in their philosophy. Conversely, Aristotle's Politics assert that animals, as inferior beings, exist to serve humans, including as food. Augustine drew on Aristotle to argue that the universe's natural hierarchy allows humans to eat animals, and animals to eat plants. Enlightenment philosophers were likewise divided. Descartes wrote that animals are merely animated machines, and Kant considered them inferior beings for lack of discernment; means rather than ends. But Voltaire and Rousseau disagreed. The latter argued that meat-eating is a social rather than a natural act, because children are not interested in meat.

Later philosophers examined the changing practices of eating meat in the modern age as part of a process of detachment from animals as living beings. Norbert Elias, for instance, noted that in medieval times cooked animals were brought to the table whole, but that since the Renaissance only the edible parts are served, which are no longer recognizably part of an animal. Modern eaters, according to Noëlie Vialles, demand an "ellipsis" between meat and dead animals; for instance, calves' eyes are no longer considered a delicacy as in the Middle Ages, but provoke disgust. Even in the English language, distinctions emerged between animals and their meat, such as between cattle and beef, pigs and pork. Fernand Braudel wrote that since the European diet of the 15th and 16th century was particularly heavy in meat, European colonialism helped export meat-eating across the globe, as colonized peoples took up the culinary habits of their colonizers, which they associated with wealth and power.

Religious traditions 

The religion of Jainism has always opposed eating meat, and there are also schools of Buddhism and Hinduism that condemn the eating of meat.

Jewish dietary rules (Kashrut) allow certain (kosher) meat and forbid other (treif). The rules include prohibitions on the consumption of unclean animals (such as pork, shellfish including mollusca and crustacea, and most insects), and mixtures of meat and milk.

Similar rules apply in Islamic dietary laws: The Quran explicitly forbids meat from animals that die naturally, blood, the meat of swine (porcine animals, pigs), and animals dedicated to other than Allah (either undedicated or dedicated to idols) which are haram as opposed to halal.

Sikhism forbids meat of slowly slaughtered animals ("kutha") and prescribes killing animals with a single strike ("jhatka"), but some Sikh groups oppose eating any meat.

Psychology

Research in applied psychology has investigated practices of meat eating in relation to morality, emotions, cognition, and personality characteristics. Psychological research suggests meat eating is correlated with masculinity, support for social hierarchy, and reduced openness to experience. Research into the consumer psychology of meat is relevant both to meat industry marketing and to advocates of reduced meat consumption.

Gender
Unlike most other food, meat is not perceived as gender-neutral, and is particularly associated with men and masculinity. Sociological research, ranging from African tribal societies to contemporary barbecues, indicates that men are much more likely to participate in preparing meat than other food. This has been attributed to the influence of traditional male gender roles, in view of a "male familiarity with killing" (Goody) or roasting being more violent as opposed to boiling (Lévi-Strauss). By and large, at least in modern societies, men also tend to consume more meat than women, and men often prefer red meat whereas women tend to prefer chicken and fish.

See also 

 Alligator meat
 Bushmeat
 Carnism
 Culinary name
 Dog meat
 Food industry
 Food science
 Gristle
 List of domesticated meat animals
 List of meat dishes
 List of foods
 Meat Atlas
 Meat on the bone
 Meat-free days
 Mechanically separated meat
 Mystery meat
 Roadkill cuisine
 Tendon
 Cat meat

References

External links 

 
 American Meat Science Association website
 Qualitionary – Legal Definitions – Meat
 IARC Monographs Q&A 
 IARC Monographs Q&A on the carcinogenicity of the consumption of red meat and processed meat. 

 
Types of food
Meat industry
Agricultural products